Nadine Ungerank (born 3 April 1996) is an Austrian sport shooter.

She participated at the 2018 ISSF World Shooting Championships, winning a medal.

References

External links
 

1996 births
Living people
Austrian female sport shooters
ISSF rifle shooters
People from Hall in Tirol
Sportspeople from Tyrol (state)
21st-century Austrian women